Gift o' Gab is a 1917 American silent comedy film directed by W.S. Van Dyke and starring Jack Gardner, Helen Ferguson and John Cossar.

Cast
 Jack Gardner as Tom Bain
 Helen Ferguson as Peggy Dinsmore
 Frank Morris as Chub Dinsmore
 John Cossar as Mr. Dinsmore

References

Bibliography
 Connelly, Robert B. The Silents: Silent Feature Films, 1910-36, Volume 40, Issue 2. December Press, 1998.

External links
 

1917 films
1917 comedy films
1910s English-language films
American silent feature films
Silent American comedy films
American black-and-white films
Films directed by W. S. Van Dyke
Essanay Studios films
1910s American films